Harpist's fingers are a cutaneous condition caused by the repetitive playing of the harp.

See also 
 Equestrian perniosis
 List of cutaneous conditions

References 

Skin conditions resulting from physical factors